Claire Parker (August 31, 1906 – October 3, 1981) was an American engineer and animator. A graduate of MIT, her best-known contribution to the history of cinema is the Pinscreen (Écran d'épingles), a vertically-mounted grid of between 240,000 and 1 million sliding metal rods that are first manually pushed into position to create lit and shaded areas, then filmed frame by frame. While the hand-operated, mechanical Pinscreen superficially shares characteristics with early optical toys like the zoetrope, it is distinguished by being one of the first devices ever to produce animation by reconfiguring a set of individual picture elements, later called pixels. A model with sufficient pin "resolution" can be used to create a Pinscreen animation of photorealistic images, a painstaking process analogous to modern pixel art.

Parker shared directing credits for her films with her husband and collaborator, Russian animator Alexandre Alexeieff; however, the 1935 French and 1937 U.S. patents on the Pinscreen were made in her name alone. Alexeieff and Parker's Pinscreen films include Night on Bald Mountain (1933) and The Nose (1963), as well as the opening title sequence for Orson Welles' film The Trial (1962). , the last known original Pinscreen still being used in animation production is maintained at the National Film Board of Canada's main campus in Montreal. A second screen was constructed and put into production in 2018.

Further reading
 The Unique Pinscreen Animation of Alexandre Alexeieff & Claire Parker

References

1906 births
1981 deaths
Stop motion animators
American women animators
20th-century American women artists
Massachusetts Institute of Technology alumni